Gilbarco Inc., doing business as Gilbarco Veeder-Root, is a supplier of fuel dispensers, point of sales systems, payment systems, forecourt merchandising and support services. The company operates as a subsidiary of Vontier and its headquarters are in Greensboro, North Carolina, United States. It employs approximately 4,000 people worldwide, with sales, manufacturing, research, development, and service locations in North and South America, Europe, Asia, the Pacific Rim, Australia, the Middle East and Africa.

Regional offices are located throughout the US and Canada, and in the United Kingdom, Italy, France, Germany, The Netherlands, United Arab Emirates, Morocco, Egypt, South Africa, Malaysia, Thailand, China, Korea, Australia, New Zealand, India, Brazil and Argentina.

The company's manufacturing and development facilities are located in Greensboro, and in Simsbury, Connecticut, Altoona, Pennsylvania, Lakewood, Colorado, Tipp City, Ohio and Davenport, Iowa. International manufacturing and development locations include the United Kingdom, Italy, Germany, India, China and Brazil.

History
The company was founded under the name Gilbert & Barker in 1870 by Charles Gilbert and John Barker. The company was renamed as Gilbarco in 1929. For nearly 100 years Gilbarco was an affiliate of what is today the Exxon Mobil Corporation until it was later acquired by the British engineering company GEC in 1987. Among Gilbarco's first products was a simple oil burning lamp, which was given away in China and other places to increase the purchase of lamp oil. That lamp was so popular within the Exxon culture that it was the inspiration for the name of Exxon's in house magazine "The Lamp" until that publication was discontinued in recent years. In 1999 GEC renamed itself to Marconi and Gilbarco became Marconi Commerce Systems.  In 2002 Gilbarco was acquired by the Danaher Corporation, parent company of Veeder-Root and Red Jacket companies, and became Gilbarco Veeder-Root.

In 1984 Gilbarco launched one of U.S. first and, at the time, most successful instances of lean manufacturing called CRISP: Continuous Rapid Improvement System of Production. As a result, in 1994 Gilbarco's United States manufacturing plant in Greensboro, North Carolina was designated by Industry Week Magazine as One of United States Ten Best Plants. After Gilbarco was acquired by Danaher, the Gilbarco CRISP system was extended and adopted company wide and ultimately evolved into what is today known as the Danaher Business System.

In 2002, the Gilbarco and Veeder-Root companies combined into one marketing brand.

In May 2008, the company launched the website AskAboutPCI.com, as a reference for convenience store retailers to learn more about the Payment Card Industry (PCI) rules, regulations, and deadlines.

Gilbarco Veeder-Root was featured on the June 14, 2008, episode of the television show John Ratzenberger's Made in America. Danaher spun off several subsidiaries, including Gilbarco Veeder-Root, in 2016 to create Fortive.

In May 2019, Gilbarco Veeder-Root announced that after extensive testing of Passport® version 11.04B, CITGO Petroleum Corporation released EMV acceptance software for retailers at the forecourt. Along with EMV, Version 11.04B brings Passport EDGE to the CITGO network and is now available to CITGO branded sites with Gilbarco Veeder-Root dispensers. Passport EDGE is Gilbarco’s new tablet-based POS system for small businesses, available as a low cost subscription, and EMV-ready indoor and outdoor acceptance.

Products
 Veeder-Root supplies automatic tank gauging and fuel management systems, including the Red Jacket brand of submersible pumps and pressurized line leak detectors. A subsidiary, ANGI Energy Systems, develops and produces compressed natural gas (CNG) systems. Veeder-Root is headquartered in Simsbury, Connecticut.
 Gasboy International is a manufacturer and marketer of commercial electronic and mechanical petroleum dispensing systems, fleet management systems, and transfer pumps, primarily for non-retail petroleum applications. Gasboy also offers a complementary line of automated fueling systems that provide 24-hour unattended fueling capabilities to fleets and retail marketers. Gasboy is headquartered in Greensboro, North Carolina.

See also
 Coulomb Technologies
 National Association of Convenience Stores

References

External links
 
 eXtremely Secure, CSP Magazine, May 2009
Sheetz Awards PCI Upgrade to Gilbarco Veeder-Root, CSP.net, March 2009
 Gilbarco Passport enhancements facilitate compliance and faster execution of growth features, NPNweb.com, May 2009
 Gilbarco Launches AskAboutPCI.com Interactive Payment Security Website, May 2008
 Bite the Bullet, By: Jerry Soverinsky, NACS Magazine, April 2009
 The PCI ABCs By: Jerry Soverinksy, NACS Magazine, September 2008
 Repair of Gilbarco products

Point of sale companies
Manufacturing companies established in 1870
General Electric Company
Companies based in Greensboro, North Carolina
Manufacturing companies based in North Carolina
1870 establishments in North Carolina
American companies established in 1870